Maddox Park is a  community park located in the west side of Atlanta (in the Bankhead neighborhood), across Donald Lee Hollowell Parkway from Bankhead MARTA station. The park has an existing rail line running through it, which is part of the proposed route of the Belt Line. The park is named in honor of former Atlanta mayor Robert Maddox and opened in 1931.

The park is planned to expand while connecting to the BeltLine and a series of parks encircling the city.

References

External links

Parks in Atlanta